Root River may refer to:

Canada
Root River (Northwest Territories), a tributary of the Mackenzie River
Root River (Algoma District), a tributary of the St. Marys River
Root River (Kenora District), a tributary of Lac Seul

United States
Root River (Minnesota)
Root River (Wisconsin)
Root River State Trail, Minnesota